Running the Endless Mile is the second album by John Parr, released in 1986. The lead single "Blame It on the Radio" reached U.S. #88, the only song to reach the U.S. singles charts. The first track on the album, "Two Hearts", was taken from the soundtrack to the film American Anthem. However, an earlier soundtrack hit, Parr's #1 hit of the previous summer "St. Elmo's Fire (Man in Motion)" from the film of the same title (and also on the Atlantic label) was not included on this album, which may have limited its sales (the album failed to crack the Top 200 in the U.S.). Instead, a song that was on his first album, "Don't Leave Your Mark on Me" was repeated in a different version.

Background
Running the Endless Mile was recorded in various studios over a period of five months in 1986. Parr told Billboard in 1986, "I needed to have an album out this year because it's been two years since my last one. The only way to do it was in between promotion and gigs in Europe. So wherever I wrote, I recorded at the same time."

Track listing
All songs written by John Parr unless noted.
"Two Hearts (American Anthem)" - 6:09
"Don't Worry 'Bout Me" - 4:05
"King of Lies" - 4:08
"Running the Endless Mile" - 4:19
"Don't Leave Your Mark on Me (Mark 2)" (Julia Downes, Parr) - 4:19
"Scratch" - 4:39
"Do It Again" - 4:08
"Blame It on the Radio" - 4:16
"The Story Still Remains the Same (Vices)" (Downes, Parr) - 3:52
"Steal You Away (Flight of the Spruce Goose)" - 5:30

Personnel
John Parr - lead vocals, guitar, keyboards
Pete Bonas - guitar
Craig Jones - guitar
Michael Landau - guitar
Christopher Marra - guitar
Bruce Laing - bass
Brad Lang - bass
Steve Bodicker - keyboards
John Cook - keyboards
Richard Cottle - keyboards
Julia Downes - keyboards
Randy Kerber - keyboards
Tony Mitman - keyboards
Neil Richmond - synthesizer, programming
Peter-John Vettese - keyboards
Martin Dobson - saxophone
Jerry Hey - horn
Tony Beard - drums
Graham Broad - drums, percussion
Peter Hammond - drums, percussion, engineer
Jeff Porcaro - drums, percussion
Roddy Matthews - backing vocals
Lee Matty - backing vocals
Chuck Kirkpatrick - backing vocals
Gareth Mortimer - backing vocals
Gill O'Donovan - backing vocals
John Sambataro - backing vocals
Karen Sambrooke - backing vocals
Chris Thompson - backing vocals
Marty Thompson - backing vocals
Will Gosling - engineer

Notes 

1986 albums
John Parr albums
Atlantic Records albums